Uroš Blagojević (born 21 March 2002) is a Serbian footballer who currently plays as a left-back for Radnički 1923.

Career statistics

Club

Notes

References

2002 births
Living people
Serbian footballers
Serbia youth international footballers
Association football defenders
Serbian First League players
FK Zemun players
Red Star Belgrade footballers
RFK Grafičar Beograd players
FK Novi Pazar players